The French ironclad Armide was a wooden-hulled armored corvette built for the French Navy in the mid-1860s. Placed into reserve after completion, she was first mobilized for the Franco-Prussian War of 1870–1871. She spent the rest of her career in the Mediterranean and then in the Far East as flagship of the French squadrons there, until her decommissioning in 1880. Armide was use as a target for gunnery trials in 1886.

Design and description
The s were designed as improved versions of the armored corvette  suitable for foreign deployments. Unlike their predecessor the Alma-class ships were true central battery ironclads as they were fitted with armored transverse bulkheads. Like most ironclads of their era they were equipped with a metal-reinforced ram.

Her crew numbered 316 officers and men.

Propulsion
The ship had a single horizontal three-cylinder return connecting-rod steam engine driving a single four-bladed propeller. Her engine was powered by four Creusot oval boilers. On sea trials the engine produced  and the ship reached .

Armament
Armide mounted her four  Modèle 1864 breech-loading guns in the central battery on the battery deck. The other two 194 mm guns were mounted in barbettes on the upper deck, sponsoned out over the sides of the ship. The four  guns were also mounted on the upper deck. She may have exchanged her Mle 1864 guns for Mle 1870 guns. The guns could fire both solid shot and explosive shells.

Armor
The unarmored portions of her sides were protected by  iron plates.

Service
Armide was laid down at Rochefort in 1865 and launched on 12 April 1867. The ship began her sea trials on 5 October 1867 and was put into reserve at Brest immediately after her completion. She was commissioned on 20 July 1870 to serve with the Baltic Squadron during the Franco-Prussian War. The squadron was ordered to lift its blockade of the Prussian Baltic ports on 16 September and return to Cherbourg. Armide was decommissioned on 1 November, but was recommissioned on 12 January 1871 to blockade the Prussian corvette  in Lisbon for the duration of the war. Afterward she was transferred to the Mediterranean where she remained until 1873.

Armide was decommissioned on 28 October 1873 at Toulon and had her armament reduced to six guns. She was recommissioned as the flagship of the Levant Squadron on 25 August 1874. On 19 September 1875 Armide was in Algiers. The ship was reduced to reserve in December 1875 at Brest. She was recommissioned in 1877 as the flagship of the China Squadron under Rear Admiral Duburquois and departed Brest on 17 January 1878. She was relieved by her sister  on 22 January 1880 at Singapore. She was decommissioned at Toulon on 17 March 1880 and condemned on 25 October 1882. Armide was used in gunnery trials in March 1886 and filled with watertight barrels to keep her from sinking.

Notes

Footnotes

References
 

 
 

Ships built in France
Alma-class ironclads
1867 ships